Linda Hsien Wang (born 19??) is an American actress. She traces her ancestry to Shanghai and Shandong, she was raised in Queens, New York. Also known as Linda Wang, Linda H. Wang and Wáng Xiànlíng (王憲苓). She has been profiled in Chinese-language media in the United States. She currently resides in the Los Angeles area.

Biography

Early life and education
At seven years old, Linda Wang began modeling for Kodak film. Later, during her first year in high school, she auditioned for the part of Field Reporter in Pushing Hands. The Oscar award winning director Ang Lee told her she was just too young for the part. They spent half an hour talking about Wang's pen and ink artwork "Repeating" which at the time was being exhibited at the New York Transit Museum. However, Wang stated Lee also gave her valuable advice on where to study and how to continue to pursue her acting career. Three months later, Wang auditioned and was accepted to study for two years under the teen program with Herbert Berghof (co-founder, with wife Uta Hagen, of the HB Studio, NYC). She then went on to New York University, and studied at the Lee Strasberg Theatre Academy.

Career

Film
Linda Wang's Hollywood film career includes a heartbreaking role in Neal Hollander's controversial film Birds of Passage as "Fu Ling" opposite Stacy Keach. The film was banned in certain locations in China due to the One-Child Policy story line, and was instead filmed on location in the Philippines and South China sea. She also starred with actor Ernie Rivera in the Indie film Red Betta, directed by Allena Rennee. Additional notable appearances were in The Violent Kind, Scarred City, Dead Air, Dark City and What Ever Happened to Mason Reese? which was directed by Brett Ratner.

Her off-screen film credit was in the 2008 comedy Tropic Thunder. Wang had previously worked as a Chinese script translator for the producer and writer David Milch on several episodes of his HBO hit television show Deadwood. She had openly expressed her regrets for not standing up for her rights for screen credit for her work on Deadwood to Milch. Wang was later recommended by Milch to one of the casting directors of the film Tropic Thunder and was immediately hired by producer Eric McLeod as the Chinese script translator to aid writers Justin Theroux and Etan Cohen during pre-production. She was asked to come back but would only work under the condition that she received screen credit for her work. McLeod agreed and Wang went on to work as the on-set script translator for director Ben Stiller and dialogue coach for Robert Downey, Jr., as well as All actors with in the film such as Reggie Lee and Brandon Soo Hoo that had Chinese dialogue in the film.

Linda Wang played an evil villain named Contessa Dell"Oro, a non-Asian role, as the leader of an army of commandos who plot to destroy all human life on earth with the devastating X-bomb Nuclear Missile in a dark comedy called Blonde Squad

Linda Wang was in the film Low Down, which won Best Cinematography Award in the US Dramatic category at the Sundance Film Festival in 2014. Written by: Amy Albany and Topper Lilien. Directed by: Jeff Priess. Stars: Elle Fanning, Glenn Close, John Hawkes, Peter Dinklage, Lena Headey, Taryn Manning, Caleb Landry Jones and Flea. (Cast by Justine Baddeley & Kim Davis-Wagner ) Intriguingly, Wang had previously worked with Hawkes on the HBO series Deadwood as a Chinese translator and character during the show in 2004 to 2005. The award-winning film is about Joe Albany, a well-known jazz musician; the story line was told through the wise eyes of his young daughter, Amy Elle Fanning. Low Down chronicles the torrid, true life of jazz pianist Joe Albany. Born into her beloved father's unorthodox segment of society, Amy's improvisational adolescence evolves in the shadow of Joe's struggle between his musical genius and a suffocating heroin addiction. Low Down was also at the November 2015 Lineup of the Taipei Golden Horse Film Festival. The prestigious award is considered the Chinese Oscar. Elle Fanning Wins Best Actress Award at the Karlovy Vary International Film Festival for Low Down.

Linda Wang was in Martin Scorsese's Revenge of the Green Dragons, which she shot in her home town Elmhurst, Queens, New York. The film had its world premiere on September 10, 2014, at the 2014 Toronto International Film Festival, and then went on to be screened at a number of other international film festivals. Written by : Michael Di Jiacomo.  Stars: Ray Liotta, Harry Shum, Jr., Justin Chon, Kevin Wu and Jin Auyeung. Directed by the Dual Andrews -Andrew Lau and Andrew Loo (Cast by Avy Kaufman) Wang played the mother of two boys drawn into the world of Asian gangs in Queens, New York. The film Revenge of the Green Dragons is close to heart to Wang due to the fact that the lead characters including the victims and youth gang members all grew up with her from elementary school. Interesting fact; The film female character Tina Sham in  real life was Wang's best friend in junior high school who later was tragically murdered alongside Sham's boyfriend Tommy Mach in Sands points, Long Island, by the malicious Queens, New York gang The Green Dragons. Wang was quoted saying in a recent interview: "The lead character Tina Sham was one of my real-life best friend. Unfortunately, she was tragically kidnapped, killed. Her disappearance and death broke my heart into a thousand pieces..." (Quoted from an article -Actress Linda Wang gives the lowdown on her role in the biopic drama 'Low Down' and her Life ... )

Linda Wang recently was just in a feature film My Favorite Five with Steven Williams, Rochelle Aytes and Brian White directed by Paul Hannah currently on Netflix, CENTRICTV and BET. Recently, Linda Wang was in a film "Girls on Film" in collaboration with as Kodak. Shot on Kodak 35mm and 16mm motion picture film and the new KODAK Super 8 Camera, stars Suki Waterhouse, Poppy Jamie, Linda Wang and Anya Varda which was filmed in Los Angeles, CA. Suki Waterhouse, Poppy Jamie, Linda Wang, Anya Varda all used their first name in the film.

Television
Wang has appeared on HBO's Deadwood, House M.D., Comedy Central’s The Naked Trucker & the T Bone Show, and the Spanish series Secretos. She also had a cameo role on 8 Simple Rules as David Spade's speed date. For several years, Wang worked on numerous sketch comedy skits on NBC's Late Night with Conan O'Brien show,  most notably as the recurring masturbating bear's girlfriend. Wang also appeared alongside Will Ferrell and Chris Kattan as the three Nagano Geishas on Saturday Night Live. She has also had roles in the soap operas One Life to Live, Port Charles, Another World, Guiding Light, As the World Turns, and Days of Our Lives. Wang also made a guest appearance in children's television including Sesame Street and Mathnet.

Linda Wang can be seen doing a skit with Tracy Morgan and Jimmy Kimmel on Jimmy Kimmel Live! Wang will also be co-starring with John Schneider, Carmen Electra, Dennis Haskins and Miguel A. Núñez Jr on a New TV Pilot called Back Nine directed by Jason Filardi and written by Mark Perez for Spike TV.

Linda Wang worked on Sports Show with Norm Macdonald, a pilot for Comedy Central with Norm Macdonald and Ben Hoffman.

Linda Wang  appeared as officer Maria Lee in Secretos (Ep: Persa) a crime series, currently airing on Hulu Channel worldwide.

Linda Wang recently was recurred on the TV pilot Dragon Palace

Theatre
Wang's theatre experience includes starring as Rose Choy in Serenade In Blue written by Tony Award-nominated playwright Jerome Coopersmith, and directed by the Emmy Award-winning director Yanna Kroyt Brandt at the prestigious Lincoln Center Theater, New York City. Linda also starred as Pocahontas in an AEA stage production of Disney Friends around the World. For the past few years, you may seen a glimpse of Linda Wang's 3-minute stand-up comedy act at the M Bar on Sunset Blvd.

Voice-overs
Linda Wang was the former Citibank worldwide Chinese Mandarin spokesperson for five years. She has also had Chinese Mandarin voice-overs in multiple voice commercials, including the Standard Federal Savings bank, The American Diabetes Foundation, Hepatitis B Foundation, Anti-smoking USA, AT&T, MasterCard, Magellan,  IDT, Colgate, Apple Savings bank, Holdcom, Bizfon, Honey Bunches Oats, Ford Motor Company, US Postal services, Berkley Productions, Smirnoff, Western Union, San Manuel Indian Bingo and Casino, Red Rock Casino and Honda Accord. She is in her third year as voice of the Mandarin Chinese spokesperson spot for AIG, alongside actress Stockard Channing. She also provided the voice of "Sexy bathhouse girl" in the video game James Bond 007: Rogue Agent—GoldenEye among others. She also provided the voice of Ming in Amy Tan's  children's animated series Sagwa, the Chinese Siamese Cat.

Music videos
In 2007, Linda Wang appeared in the music video "Home" for the Irish pop group Westlife. In 2014 you will see Linda Wang in a film starring Flea of the rock band Red Hot Chili Peppers called Low Down directed by Jeff Preiss which won the Best Cinematography award at the Sundance Film Festival 2014.

Modeling
As a former Miss Teen Pola Asia, Linda Wang is the upcoming spokesmodel for Soho Sportswear for the Asian market. She was asked to design a few items under the Linda Wang Line. Linda Wang worked on a T-Mobile Commercial with Burt Reynolds and Paris Hilton in A Chinese Herb shop. She was quoted as saying Burt Reynold made faces when Paris Hilton was late on set. Reynold spoke about Viagra and working with Jackie Chan on the film The Cannonball Run. Having been previously a Pantene Pro-V hair model, Wang has also been chosen as the first female hand-model for Scrabble in 75 years. Recently, Linda Wang was chosen to be Face Model on BIOLASE print ad worldwide., In summer of 2015 and 2016, Wang did a campaign for Costco which will appeared in the Chinese section. Wang completed an International UPS commercial for USA and China in 2018.

Charity work
Since March 1997, Linda Wang has been a volunteer member promoting "Kids for Kids", the New York City Pediatric AIDS foundation benefit. In Los Angeles, Wang participated in the VERB Campaigns for both Disney and Nickelodeon TV, a program designed to encourage children to take the hour gained from the fall time change to be more active physically. She also participates in various animal protection organizations' charitable events. In the summer of 2005 Wang begin to Volunteer out of pocket to distribute bag called "A bag of smile" for the Homeless with in the City of Los Angeles and Orange County. This monthly program where Wang pre-prepared individually a large size sandwich bag with a bottle of water,a pair of sox, banana, nut mix, mini sun block and tooth paste. "A bag of smile" program has reached over 10,000+ homeless people within the last 12 years.

References

External links

Linda Wang on Myspace

Actresses from Los Angeles
Actresses from New York City
American female models
American film actresses
American stage actresses
American television actresses
American voice actresses
New York University alumni
Living people
People from Queens, New York
Actresses from Taipei
Taiwanese emigrants to the United States
Year of birth missing (living people)
Place of birth missing (living people)
21st-century American actresses
20th-century American actresses
American actresses of Chinese descent